Jason Danskin (born 28 December 1967) is an English former footballer who played in the Football League for Everton, Hartlepool United and Mansfield Town. At Mansfield he helped them win the 1986–87 Associate Members' Cup, playing in the final.

References

English footballers
English Football League players
1967 births
Living people
Everton F.C. players
Mansfield Town F.C. players
Hartlepool United F.C. players
Northwich Victoria F.C. players
People from Winsford
Association football midfielders